Otites is a genus of picture-winged fly in the family Ulidiidae.

Species
Otites angustata (Loew, 1859)
Otites anthomyina Hendel, 1911
Otites approximata Hendel, 1911
Otites atripes Loew, 1858
Otites bacescui Gheorghiu, 1987
Otites bimaculata Hendel, 1911
Otites bivittata Macquart, 1835
Otites bradescui Gheorghiu, 1988
Otites centralis (Fabricius, 1805)
Otites cinerosa Jacentkovsky, 1934
Otites dominula (Loew, 1868)
Otites erythrocephala (Hendel, 1911)
Otites erythrosceles Steyskal, 1966
Otites formosa (Panzer, 1798)
Otites gradualis Carles-Tolra, 1998
Otites grata (Loew, 1856)
Otites guttatus (Meigen, 1830) 
Otites immaculata (Rondani, 1869)
Otites jucunda (Robineau-Desvoidy, 1830)
Otites kowarzi (Loew, 1873)
Otites lamed (Schrank, 1781)
Otites levigata (Loew, 1873)
Otites maculipennis (Latreille, 1811)
Otites michiganus Steyskal, 1966
Otites mucescens Hendel, 1911
Otites murina (Loew, 1864)
Otites nebulosa (Latreille, 1811)
Otites obliqua (Loew, 1868)
Otites pyrrhocephala (Loew, 1876)
Otites rivularis (Fabricius, 1805)
Otites silvicola (Rivosecchi, 1992)
Otites snowi (Cresson, 1924)
Otites stigma (Hendel, 1911)

References

 
Ulidiidae
Brachycera genera
Taxa named by Pierre André Latreille